Donji Žabar is a village and municipality located in Republika Srpska, an entity of Bosnia and Herzegovina. As of 2013, it has a population of 3,809 inhabitants, while the village of Donji Žabar has a population of 1,208 inhabitants.

History
Municipality was also known as Srpsko Orašje (Српско Орашје), and was created from part of the pre-war municipality of Orašje (the other part of the pre-war municipality is now in the Federation of Bosnia and Herzegovina).

Demographics

Population

Ethnic composition

See also
 Municipalities of Republika Srpska

References

External links

 Municipalities of Republika Srpska

Populated places in Donji Žabar
Municipalities of Republika Srpska